William Christie Gosse  (11 December 1842–12 August 1881), was an Australian explorer, who was born in Hoddesdon, Hertfordshire, England and immigrated to Australia with his father Dr. William Gosse in 1850. He was educated at J. L. Young's Adelaide Educational Institution and in 1859 he entered the Government service of South Australia. He held various positions in the survey department, including Deputy Surveyor-General. He died of a heart attack on 12 August 1881, aged 38, after a long illness.

Although Gosse's exploration was not groundbreaking, he filled in many details in the central map. He named the Musgrave Ranges and was able correctly to lay down the position of some of the discoveries of Ernest Giles. On 19 July 1873 he reached an inselberg and gave it the name Ayers Rock. He was the first European man to climb the rock, along with an Afghan member of his party, Kamran.

Family
Gosse married Gertrude Ritchie in 1860, but died of typhoid fever five months later.

Gosse married Agnes "Aggie" Hay (1853–1933), a daughter of Alexander Hay and his first wife Agnes née Kelly (1818–1870) on 22 December 1874. (Hay's second wife, Agnes Grant née Gosse, was William's sister.) William and Aggie had three children: 
William Hay Gosse MC (1875–1918) was killed in action in France. He married Muriel, née Davidson, who died in 1920. Their son George Gosse (1912–1964) was awarded the George Cross in 1946; 
Sir James Hay Gosse (1876–1952) married Joanna Lang, daughter of Tom Elder Barr Smith – they had a daughter and four sons; and 
Edith Agnes Gosse (1878-).

A brother-in-law, and also nephew, William Gosse Hay (1875–1945) was an author.

A sister-in-law, and also niece, Helen (1877–1909), and her mother (William's sister), were lost at sea on the ill-fated .

Other descendants include former Australian Minister for Foreign Affairs and Liberal Party leader Alexander Downer.

Recognition
In 1931, the Hundred of Gosse, a cadastral division located on Kangaroo Island in South Australia was named in Gosse's memory.  In 1976 he was honoured on a postage stamp bearing his portrait issued by Australia Post.

See also
Gosses Bluff crater
Gosse, South Australia

References

Explorers of Australia
Explorers of South Australia
1842 births
1881 deaths
Australian people of English descent
People educated at Adelaide Educational Institution